Lake Batur is a volcanic crater lake in Kintamani, Bali, Bangli Regency of Bali, located about  northeast of Ubud in Bali. The lake is inside of the caldera of an active volcano, Mount Batur, located along the Ring of Fire of volcanic activity.

Geography 
Lake Batur lies south-east of the active Mount Batur volcano, inside the older Batur caldera.

Bathymetry 
The deepest point in the lake is around 88 meters.

Watershed

Inflow from agriculture 
The Batur caldera is an important agricultural area, with cultivation of a wide range of produce. The irrigation water flows back into the lake after it has been pumped up, bringing with it nutrients to the lake body.

Inflow from hot springs 
In the village of Toya Bungkah, there are several hot springs related to the volcanic activity of the Mount Batur volcano. These have been developed for tourism purposes. The water from these hot springs flows into the lake.

Aquaculture 
The Batur lake has been in recent years, farmed for fish. The Nile tilapia was the dominant species in the lake when a study was undertaken in 2011. The local name for the fish is Ikan Mujair.

Fish death 
On the morning of 19 June 2011, greenish-white spots emerged on the surface of the lake. These spots later merged, stretching from Toya Bungkah to Buahan. In conjunction with the colour changes, thousands of dead fish floated to the surface. The cause of the fish death was believed to be related to the high diurnal-temperature difference during the onset of the dry season. As a result of the temperature difference, mixing of the water happened due to currents developed, which in turn mixed up the decomposing sediments, bringing toxic gases to the surface. By late 21 June 2011, the water colour was back to normal.

References 

Landforms of Bali
Batur
Bangli Regency